Psilocymbium is a genus of South American sheet weavers that was first described by Alfred Frank Millidge in 1991.

Species
 it contains seven species, found in Colombia, Peru, Brazil, and Argentina:
Psilocymbium acanthodes Miller, 2007 – Argentina
Psilocymbium antonina Rodrigues & Ott, 2010 – Brazil
Psilocymbium defloccatum (Keyserling, 1886) – Peru
Psilocymbium incertum Millidge, 1991 – Colombia
Psilocymbium lineatum (Millidge, 1991) – Brazil, Argentina
Psilocymbium pilifrons Millidge, 1991 – Colombia
Psilocymbium tuberosum Millidge, 1991 (type) – Brazil

See also
 List of Linyphiidae species (I–P)

References

Araneomorphae genera
Linyphiidae
Spiders of South America